USS Montpelier (SSN-765), a , is the third ship of the United States Navy to be named for Montpelier, Vermont. The contract to build her was awarded to Newport News Shipbuilding and Dry Dock Company in Newport News, Virginia on 6 February 1987 and her keel was laid down on 19 May 1989.  She was christened 6 April 1991, launched on 23 August 1991 sponsored by Mrs. Nancy Hayes Sununu, and commissioned on 13 March 1993 with Commander Victor Fiebig in command.

Service history
USS Montpelier was the first submarine to launch Tomahawk cruise missiles in Operation Iraqi Freedom. She would go on to fire all 20 missiles earning her a "clean sweep" under the command of CDR William J. Frake.

On 27 May 2004 Montpelier went through an 18-month Depot Modernization Period (DMP) at Portsmouth Naval Shipyard in Kittery, Maine.  The ship and crew completed this period three months ahead of schedule and, after successfully completing sea trials returned to their home port in Virginia. The boat entered Norfolk Naval Shipyard on 5 February 2010 for modernization, maintenance, and upgrades, expected to cost around $35 million for 640,000-man hours, and included changing the submarine's buoyancy characteristics and upgrading its sonar capabilities.  The work was completed and the sub returned to the fleet on 26 July 2010, eight days earlier than scheduled.

The "Mighty Monty" is stationed in Groton, Connecticut.

Accident
Both ships were conducting a training exercise at the time of the incident. No one on board either ship was injured. The sub's captain, Commander Thomas Winter, was relieved and the sub has since undergone $70 million in repairs.

Awards

References

External links
 

Ships built in Newport News, Virginia
Los Angeles-class submarines
Montpelier, Vermont
Nuclear submarines of the United States Navy
1991 ships
Submarines of the United States